The Fate of the Earth is a 1982 book by Jonathan Schell. Its description of the consequences of nuclear war "forces even the most reluctant person to confront the unthinkable: the destruction of humanity and possibly most life on Earth". The work is regarded as a key document in the nuclear disarmament movement.

The book is composed of three essays. The third and final, "The Choice", is an argument that the source of the nuclear threat is the nation-state system, and that the choice is between survival and national sovereignty.

Criticism

In his review of The Fate of the Earth, Brian Martin posited that the argument that "most people" would die in the nuclear war is highly exaggerated, especially for the Global South. He explains the discrepancy:

It is possible, on the other hand, to set against this claim some lines from the book:
"To say that human extinction is a certainty would, of course, be a misrepresentation—just as it would be a misrepresentation to say that extinction can be ruled out. To begin with, we know that a holocaust may not occur at all. If one does occur, the adversaries may not use all their weapons. If they do use all their weapons, the global effects, in the ozone and elsewhere, may be moderate. And if the effects are not moderate but extreme, the ecosphere may prove resilient enough to withstand them without breaking down catastrophically". (pp. 93-94.)
More generally, Schell's analysis of the effects of a full-scale nuclear exchange proceeds from a stance of cognitive modesty:
"In weighing the fate of the earth and, with it, our own fate, we stand before a mystery, and in tampering with the earth we tamper with a mystery. We are in deep ignorance. Our ignorance should dispose us to wonder, our wonder should make us humble, our humility should inspire us to reverence and caution, and our reverence and caution should lead us to act without delay to withdraw the threat we now pose to the earth and to ourselves." (p.95)

In popular culture
 In the 1985 Infocom interactive fiction game A Mind Forever Voyaging, The Fate of the Earth is on the list of banned books, tapes, and programs issued by the Morality Bureau of the government in Rockvil's Main Library in the 2071 simulation.

See also
 List of books about nuclear issues
 On Nuclear Terrorism
 Nuclear winter

References

External links
 The Fate of the Earth by Jonathan Schell

1982 non-fiction books
1982 in the environment
Books about politics of the United States
Books about nuclear issues